John Munford Gregory (July 8, 1804April 9, 1884) was a US political figure and Acting Governor of Virginia from 1842 to 1843.

Biography
Gregory was born in Virginia on July 8, 1804, and was a member of the Virginia state House of Delegates from 1831 to 1840. He served as acting Governor of Virginia from 1842 to 1843 and then as a state court judge in Virginia  Gregory died on April 9, 1884, and was buried at Shockoe Hill Cemetery in Richmond, Virginia. One of the enslaved people that Gregory hired, John Dunjee, escaped and became a prominent Baptist preacher.

His home at Richmond after 1849, the Benjamin Watkins Leigh House, was listed on the National Register of Historic Places in 1969.

References

External links
A Guide to the Executive Papers of Governor John M. Gregory, 1842–1843 at The Library of Virginia

Governors of Virginia
Members of the Virginia House of Delegates
1804 births
1884 deaths
College of William & Mary alumni
United States Attorneys for the Eastern District of Virginia
Virginia state court judges
Virginia Whigs
Whig Party state governors of the United States
People from Charles City County, Virginia
19th-century American politicians
19th-century American lawyers
19th-century American judges